Doerner is a surname. Notable people with the surname include:

 Charles Doerner, Luxembourgish chess master
 Christine Doerner, Luxembourgish politician
 Cynthia Doerner, Australian tennis player
 Darrick Doerner, American surfer
 Gus Doerner, American basketball player
 Luke Doerner, Australian field hockey player
 Max Doerner (artist), German artist
 Max Doerner (rugby league), Australian rugby player
 William Doerner, American professor

See also
 Doerner Institute, research institute in Munich, Germany
 Dorner or Dörner, related surname